A constitutional referendum was held in Uruguay on 25 November 1962 alongside general elections. The proposed amendments to the constitution were rejected by 83% of voters.

Proposals
The amendments had been put forward by the Ruralista/Herrerista faction of the Colorado Party through the General Assembly, and proposed re-introducing a presidential system of government to replace the colegiado system.

Results

References

1962 referendums
1962 in Uruguay
Referendums in Uruguay
Constitutional referendums in Uruguay
November 1962 events in South America